Noah Clarke (born June 11, 1979) is an American former professional ice hockey left winger.

Biography
Clarke was born in La Verne, California. As a youth, he played in the 1992 and 1993 Quebec International Pee-Wee Hockey Tournaments with a minor ice hockey team from Ontario, California.

Clarke made his NHL debut on December 16, 2003 vs. the Edmonton Oilers and  scored his first career NHL goal on March 12, 2007 against the Edmonton Oilers, becoming the first native of Southern California to record a goal for the Kings. Clarke was signed by the New Jersey Devils in 2007. In May 2008, he signed a two-year contract with HC Ambri-Piotta in the Swiss National League. In Ambrì, Clarke played with former NHL player Erik Westrum and was coached by the 1980 Olympic Gold Medalist John Harrington, he left on 17 December Ambri and moved to Rauman Lukko. The following season Clarke returned to Ambri before splitting the year again with HC Slavia Prague of the Czech Extraliga.

On July 16, 2010, Clarke signed a one-year contract as a free agent to play in Germany with Augsburger Panther of the Deutsche Eishockey Liga. On June 29, 2012, Clarke signed with Belfast Giants in the British  Elite Ice Hockey League.

Career statistics

Awards and honors

References

External links

1979 births
American men's ice hockey left wingers
Augsburger Panther players
Colorado College Tigers men's ice hockey players
Des Moines Buccaneers players
HC Ambrì-Piotta players
HC Slavia Praha players
Ice hockey players from California
Living people
Los Angeles Kings draft picks
Los Angeles Kings players
Lowell Devils players
Lukko players
Manchester Monarchs (AHL) players
New Jersey Devils players
Belfast Giants players
People from La Verne, California
AHCA Division I men's ice hockey All-Americans
American expatriate ice hockey players in Northern Ireland
American expatriate ice hockey players in Switzerland
American expatriate ice hockey players in Germany
American expatriate ice hockey players in the Czech Republic
American expatriate ice hockey players in Finland